Jiadifenolide is a sesquiterpenoid natural product with neurotrophic activity, found in Illicium jiadifengpi. Its biological activity and congested polycyclic structure have made it a popular target for total synthesis.

Isolation and bioactivity
The seco-prezizaane-type sesquiterpenoid jiadifenolide was isolated in 2009 from the fruit of the flowering plant Illicium jiadifengpi. Chemical synthesis enabled preliminary assessment of its in vitro activity in promoting neurite outgrowth.

Chemical synthesis

Jiadifenolide has been the subject of synthetic study in several academic labs.

The first total synthesis, reported in 2009, employed an asymmetric Robinson annulation and a translactonization reaction to construct the core of the molecule. Two further syntheses, a chiral-pool approach from (+)-pulegone and a racemic synthesis relying on a samarium diiodide–mediated reductive cyclization, were reported almost simultaneously in 2014. A second chiral-pool synthesis (from (+)-citronellal) reported in 2015 shortened the synthetic sequence, with a double Michael addition as the key transformation of eight steps, allowing the synthesis of gram-scale quantities of jiadifenolide.

References

Sesquiterpene lactones
Tertiary alcohols
Cyclopentanes
Oxygen heterocycles
Heterocyclic compounds with 5 rings